Starlight Theatre is now the only theatre operated by Rock Valley College in Rockford, Illinois;  operations of Rock Valley College Studio Theatre, an indoor blackbox theatre, have been suspended.
Starlight Theatre performs in the outdoor Bengt Sjostrom Theatre, an award-winning structure designed by Jeanne Gang and Studio Gang Architects that features a unique, one-of-a-kind movable roof. Starlight has transformed itself into a popular destination for the Northern Illinois region. The theatre is situated on 217 acres that were purchased by the college in 1965 from Dr. J.J. Rogers.

Starlight Theatre History

In the fall of 1966 a group of Rock Valley College students approached Dean of Community Services Rueben Johnson about creating a theatre program. The following year, they performed an outdoor musical near the farm pond that had been purchased in 1965 from Dr. J.J. Rogers. Community members watched the first performance on lawn chairs. Starlight Theatre has performed more than 125 productions since its founding in 1967.

1967: Finian's Rainbow (Dir. Donald Meisenholder)

1968: Patience & Waiting for Godot (Dir. Donald Colucci)

1969: Oklahoma! (Dir. John Pearce)

1970: Man of LaMancha (Dir. Ted Bacino)

1971: Oliver & Fiddler on the Roof (Dir. Ted Bacino)

1972: 1776 & The King & I (Dir. Ted Bacino)

1973: My Fair Lady & Promises, Promises (Dir. Ted Bacino)

1974: How to Succeed in Business Without Really Trying & No, No Nanette (Dir. Ted Bacino)

1975: Godspell & Jesus Christ Superstar (Dir. Ted Bacino)

1976: Of Thee I Sing, A Little Night Music (Dir. Kirk Denmark & Once Upon a Mattress Dir. Jim Smith)

1977: The Sound of Music & The Music Man (Dir. Jim Crow)

1978: Camelot & Show Boat (Dir. Jim Crow)

1979: West Side Story & Hello, Dolly! (Dir. Jim Crow)

1980: Carnival & Funny Girl (Dir. Jim Crow)

1981: Wizard of Oz & HMS Pinafore (Dir. A. Neil Thackaberry)

1982: Grease (Dir. Dominic Messimi), Jacques Brel & South Pacific (Dir. A. Neil Thackaberry)

1983: Man of LaMancha (Dir Dominic Messimi), Pirates of Penzance & Guys & Dolls (Dir. A. Neil Thackaberry)

1984: Carousel (Dir. A. Neil Thackaberry), George M Dir. Victoria Bussert & My Fair Lady (Dir. A. Neil Thackaberry)

1985: Caberet (Dir. Rod & Ginny MacDonald), Oklahoma! (Dir. Thom Sobota) & Evita (Dir. Michael P. Webb)

1986: Barum (Dir. Michael P. Webb), Music Man (Dir. Leslie Robbins) & Fiddler on the Roof (Dir. Michael P. Webb)

1987: Peter Pan, 1776 & Candide (Dir. Michael P. Webb)

1988: Camelot, Annie Get Your Gun & 42nd Street (Dir. Michael P. Webb)

1989: Oliver, Jesus Christ Superstar & Anything Goes (Dir. Michael P. Webb)

1990: The King & I, Student Prince & My One and Only (Dir. Michael P. Webb)

1991: West Side Story, Shenendoah & A Chorus Line (Dir. Michael P. Webb)

1992: Hello, Dolly, Big River & Into the Woods (Dir. Michael P. Webb)

1993: Kiss Me Kate, Rags & City of Angels (Dir. Michael P. Webb)

1994: Meet Me in St. Louis, My Fair Lady & Evita (Dir. Michael P. Webb)

1995: Seven Brides for Seven Brothers, The New Pirates of Penzance & Joseph and the Amazing Technicolor Dreamcoat (Dir. Michael P. Webb)

1996: Bye, Bye Birdie, Pippin, Crazy For You & Joseph (Dir. Michael P. Webb)

1997: Guys & Dolls, Children of Eden & Sound of Music (Dir. Michael P. Webb)

1998: Secret Garden, Cinderella & Western Star (Dir. Michael P. Webb)

1999: Annie, Once on this Island & Fiddler on the Roof (Dir. Michael P. Webb)

2000: Godspell, A Funny Thing Happened on the Way to the Forum & Hans Christian Andersen, The Storyteller's Story (Dir. Michael P. Webb)

2001: The Music Man, Grease & Rebels (Dir. Michael P. Webb)

2002: South Pacific, Honk & 42nd Street (Dir. Michael P. Webb)

2003: Big River, Just So & Children of Eden (Dir. Michael P. Webb)

2004: Show Boat, You're A Good Man Charlie Brown, The Hot Mikado & Seussical the Musical (Dir. Michael P. Webb)

2005: Oklahoma!, Jesus Christ Superstar, Chess & Disney's Beauty & the Beast (Dir. Michael P. Webb)

2006: Cats!, State Fair, Miss Saigon & Joseph (Dir. Michael P. Webb)

2007: Peter Pan, Disney's Geppetto & Son, Jekyll & Hyde & Ragtime. (Dir. by Michael P. Webb)

2008: Jonah- An Old Testament Yarn, The Wiz, Little Shop of Horrors & Thoroughly Modern Millie (Dir. by Michael P. Webb)

2009: David the King, Evita, The King and I, The Producers (Dir. by Michael P. Webb)

2010: Chicago, Aida, Annie, Rent (Dir. by Michael P. Webb)

2011: The Phantom of the Opera, After Dark, The Drowsy Chaperone, Hairspray (Dir. by Michael P. Webb)

2012: Sweeney Todd: The Demon Barber of Fleet Street!, Little Women, Into the Woods, 9 to 5: The Musical (Dir. by Michael P. Webb)

2013: Andrew Lloyd Webber's Starlight Express, Xanadu, The 25th Annual Putnam County Spelling Bee, Les Misérables (Dir. by Michael P. Webb)

2014: The Sound of Music, Tintypes, Honk!, Spamalot, Angel (Dir. by Michael P. Webb)

2015: Mary Poppins, The Last Five Years, Memphis, Young Frankenstein (Dir. by Michael P. Webb)

References

Buildings and structures in Rockford, Illinois
Theatres in Illinois
Tourist attractions in Rockford, Illinois
University and college theatres in the United States
Rock Valley College